Touch of the Light is a 2012 Taiwanese drama film directed by Chang Jung-chi. The film was selected as the Taiwanese entry for the Best Foreign Language Oscar at the 85th Academy Awards, but it did not make the final shortlist.

Plot
The story revolves around a blind music student who excels at piano but faces hardships due to his disability, and an aspiring dancer who works at a bubble tea store. Their friendship becomes mutually uplifting as they pursue their dreams.

Cast
 Sandrine Pinna as Hsiao-chieh
 Huang Yu-siang as Huang Yu-siang 
 Lee Lieh as Yu-siang's mother
 Ko Shu-chin as Hsiao-chieh's mother
 Ayugo Huang as Yu-siang's father
 Na Dou as Hsiao-chieh's boss 
 Harry Chang as Hsiao-chieh's boyfriend 
 Sheu Fang-yi as Teacher Hsu 
 Ivy Yin as Teacher Wang 
 Hsueh Shih-ling as A-hsien

Soundtrack

Awards and nominations

See also
 List of submissions to the 85th Academy Awards for Best Foreign Language Film
 List of Taiwanese submissions for the Academy Award for Best Foreign Language Film

References

External links
 

2012 films
2012 drama films
2010s Mandarin-language films
Films about blind people
Drama films based on actual events
Films about music and musicians
Taiwanese drama films